The 2003–04 Danish Cup was the 50th version of the Danish Cup. The final was played on May 20.

FC København ended as cup winner, but as they also won the Danish Superliga, the UEFA Cup-spot went to the cup runner-up Aalborg BK.

Results
The team listed to the left, is the home team.

1st round
In first round competed 48 teams from the "series" (Denmark's series and lower 2002) and 16 teams from Danish 2nd Division 2002-03.

2nd round
In second round competed 32 winning teams from 1st round and 8 teams from Danish 1st Division 2002-03 (no. 9 to 16).

3rd round
In third round competed 20 winning teams from 2nd round, 6 teams from Danish 1st Division 2002-03 (no. 3 to 8) and 2 teams from Danish Superliga 2002-03 (no. 11 and 12).

4th round
In fourth round competed 14 winning teams from 3rd round, 2 teams from Danish 1st Division 2002-03 (no. 1 and 2) and 4 teams from Danish Superliga 2002-03 (no. 7 to 10).

5th round
In fifth round competed 10 winning teams from 4th round and 6 teams from Danish Superliga 2002-03 (no. 1 to 6).

Quarter finals

Semi finals
The semi finals are played on home and away basis.

Final

The final was played at Parken Stadium.

See also
 Football in Denmark
 Danish Superliga 2003-04
 Danish 1st Division 2003-04

External links
Danish Cup 2003-04 Results from DBU 

Cup
Danish Cup
2004